Aleksandr Dmitriyevich Kuznetsov (born 15 February 1951) is a Russian professional football coach and a former player.

External links
 

1951 births
Living people
Sportspeople from Tula, Russia
Soviet footballers
Association football midfielders
FC Arsenal Tula players
PFC CSKA Moscow players
FC Volgar Astrakhan players
Soviet football managers
Russian football managers
Russian expatriate football managers
Expatriate football managers in Belarus
FC Slavia Mozyr managers
FC Gomel managers
PFC CSKA Moscow managers
Russian Premier League managers